The Winnipeg Walkway System, also known as the Winnipeg Skywalk, is a network of pedestrian skyways and tunnels connecting a significant portion of downtown Winnipeg, Manitoba.

The City of Winnipeg described the Walkway as a system of 14 skyways and 7 tunnels connecting 38 buildings and allowing for a maximum protected walk of 2 km. The walkway system has expanded since its initial construction.

The Walkway is subdivided into four interconnected segments: its skyways chiefly cover Portage, Graham, and St. Mary Avenues; and its underground section includes Winnipeg Square and the underground Portage and Main concourse.

It is open every day of the week, typically from 06:30 AM to 12:30 AM, though some individual building hours vary.

Network segments

Beginning in 2004, in anticipation of the openings of the MTS Centre and Millennium Library, a new unified system of signage was developed for the entire network to assist wayfinding therein. This process brought with it the branding of the system as the Winnipeg Walkway and the subdivision of the network into four interconnected segments.

Main Underground

The Main Underground portion of the network is centred underneath the historic intersection of Portage and Main. At street level, this intersection is closed to pedestrians; it is not (legally) possible to cross it without going underground.

On a much smaller scale, this segment is somewhat reminiscent of Montreal's Underground City. Via a network of tunnels, the Main Underground connects the following:
Portage and Main Pedestrian Loop
Trizec Complex
Winnipeg Square
360 Main (formerly Commodity Exchange Tower)
Scotiabank Building
Royal Bank Building
201 Portage (formerly Canwest Place, CanWest Global Place, and TD Centre)
TDS Law
TD Canada Trust (now at 360 Main Street)
Concourse Sports/Ergonomic Physiotherapy
Lombard Place
Richardson Building
CIBC
Fairmont Winnipeg Hotel
Lombard Concourse
161 Portage Avenue East
Grain Exchange Building
MTS and Bank of Montreal Building

At the southwestern corner of Winnipeg Square, near the intersection of Graham Avenue and Fort Street, there are escalator, lift and stairway connections to the second floor of 200 Graham Avenue, thereby connecting the Main Underground to the Graham Skywalk.

The 360 Main Street tower sits upon one of several structural pads atop Winnipeg Square. The complex is said to be able to accommodate the construction of an additional high-rise office tower on Graham Avenue as well as a low-rise building for use as a hotel on Main Street, following this same model. Construction of a 40-story residential tower at 300 Main Street began in Fall 2018.

Graham Skywalk

The Graham Skywalk consists of a series of skyways connecting the buildings on the south side of Graham Avenue, between Main and Hargrave Street, as well as the Canada Life Centre (the former site of the historic Eaton's store) and the former Eaton's power station on the north side.

From east to west, this portion of the network provides access to the following:
200 Graham Avenue
BDO Canada Ltd.
Cargill Building (240 Graham Ave)
HSBC
Canada Post Centre
Millennium Library
CityPlace
Canada Life Centre
Powerhouse Building (345 Graham Ave)
CTV Winnipeg
Winnipeg Jets Main Office
True North Square.

The Canada Life Centre can be said to be a major hub in the Winnipeg Walkway network as it connects the Graham Skywalk to the Portage Skywalk.

Portage Skywalk

The Portage Skywalk segment of the Winnipeg Walkway boasts many of the shopping and entertainment attractions most often associated with downtown Winnipeg. An extensive network of skyways and second-floor pedestrian rights-of-way connects various buildings on the south side of Portage Avenue, with the three-block Portage Place shopping and entertainment complex between Carlton and Vaughan Street on the north side. Several neighbouring residential, recreational and commercial buildings, including the One Canada Centre tower between Vaughan and Colony Street, are directly connected to Portage Place. At the western edge of Portage Place there is a skyway link to The Bay department store and the Power Building on the south side of Portage Avenue. Via an open-air connection through the covered parkade of The Bay, the network reaches further south, providing access to the Saint Mary Skywalk.

More specifically, from east to west, the Portage Skywalk links the following:
Radisson Hotel
Somerset Place
Canada Life Centre
Newport Centre (330 Portage Ave)
Bank of Montreal
Rogers
340-350 Portage Ave — small two-storey structure
Carlton Building (354 Portage Ave)
Portage Place Southside Shops
Manitoba Hydro Place (360 Portage Ave) 
Portage Place
Prairie Theatre Exchange
Free Press Building
IBM Canada
The Promenade
Kiwanis Chateau
Fred Douglas Place
YMCA/YWCA Downtown Winnipeg
One Canada Centre (447 Portage Ave)
Investors Group Wealth Management
Power Building (428 Portage Ave)
Tim Hortons
Downtown Winnipeg BIZ
The Bay and parkade
As was the case with the construction of Winnipeg Square, structural pads were built atop Portage Place to allow for future upward expansion. There is one atop each end, and there is currently a plan for an office and hotel tower to be built on the western pad.

Saint Mary Skywalk

The Saint Mary Skywalk is both the smallest, and the most tenuously-linked segment of the Winnipeg Walkway System. Its only connection to the network is via the parkade of The Bay department store. 

Beginning from The Bay parkade eastward, the Saint Mary Skywalk connects three buildings between Vaughan and Edmonton Street:
Winnipeg Clinic (425 Saint Mary Ave)
444 Saint Mary Ave — office building
Centra Gas
400 Saint Mary Avenue
ManpowerGroup
The western segment of the Saint Mary Skywalk ends at 400 Saint Mary Avenue; however, it continues again from the RBC Convention Centre, whose entrance faces Edmonton Street, and connects into the Graham Skywalk via Cityplace.

Convention Centre 
The connection between the pre-existing Convention Centre walkway system and the Winnipeg Walkway system was completed in 2010. On the two blocks bordered by Edmonton Street, Saint Mary Avenue, York Avenue, and Hargrave Street is a residential and commercial complex consisting of the Convention Centre and the various buildings of Lakeview Square.

A network of pedestrian tunnels and skyways connects the following buildings, from east to west:
RBC Convention Centre
Lakeview Square
155 Carlton Street
Business Development Bank of Canada
various departments and agencies of the Government of Manitoba
East India Company Pub & Eatery (349 York Ave entrance)
185 Carlton Street — office building
Shannon's Irish Pub (175 Carlton)
Ichiban Japanese Restaurant (189 Carlton)
Delta Hotels by Marriott Winnipeg (formerly Holiday Inn Crowne Plaza)
Elephant and Castle Pub and Restaurant
330 Saint Mary Avenue — office building
HSBC
Grimard Optical

The Convention Centre is connected by skyways to both 185 and 155 Carlton Street. The Lakeview Square development forms a 'U' around an open central courtyard which faces the Convention Centre across Carlton Street.

Other downtown pedestrian networks
In addition to the Winnipeg Walkway, is another smaller enclosed pedestrian network in downtown Winnipeg that is not currently connected to the principal Walkway network.

Civic Centre
Another series of interconnected buildings straddle Main Street, approximately 1 km north of Portage and Main. On the west side of Main Street is the Winnipeg Civic Centre and on the east side is the Manitoba Centennial Centre. This pedestrian network's tunnels link the following public buildings:
Winnipeg Civic Centre
City Hall
Administration Building
Manitoba Centennial Centre
Centennial Concert Hall
Manitoba Museum
Manitoba Museum Science Gallery
Planetarium

Unlike the Convention Centre pedestrian network, creating a pedestrian link between the Civic Centre and the principal Winnipeg Walkway System is unlikely in the foreseeable future. Not only is the distance great between the Main Underground and the Civic Centre, but any connection between the two would require sensitive tunneling underneath turn-of-the-century heritage buildings over several blocks.

References

External links

Winnipeg Square – How to Get There
Downtown Winnipeg Indoor Walkway Guide
A set of photos taken inside the Winnipeg Walkway.
Humorous CBC Television report from 1988 showcasing the perils of wayfinding in the Winnipeg Walkway.
Bruce Kuwabara's July 2005 presentation of his firm's winning design for the new Manitoba Hydro Building.

Buildings and structures in Winnipeg
Pedways in Canada
Transport in Winnipeg
Skyways
Underground cities
Buildings and structures in downtown Winnipeg
Downtown Winnipeg